The men's 200 metre individual medley event at the 2014 Commonwealth Games as part of the swimming programme took place on 29 July at the Tollcross International Swimming Centre in Glasgow, Scotland.

The medals were presented by David Wilkie, the 1974 Commonwealth champion in this event and the quaichs were presented by Dr. Bridget McConnell, Board member of Glasgow 2014.

Records
Prior to this competition, the existing world and Commonwealth Games records were as follows.

The following records were established during the competition:

Results

Heats

Final

References

External links

Men's 200 metre individual medley
Commonwealth Games